Hair moss may refer to:
Polytrichum, a genus of mosses 
 Fat choy, a terrestrial cyanobacterium that is used as a vegetable in Chinese cuisine